Van Etten Lake is a  lake in Iosco County, Michigan. The lake is largely developed with houses surrounded by dense forest. The lake flows through the Pine River into the Au Sable River and then into Lake Huron.

The Van Etten Lake State Forest Campground and Oscoda–Wurtsmith Airport make up large parts of the lakes western shoreline.

See also 
 List of lakes in Michigan

References

Lakes of Michigan